Long Street is a hamlet in the parish of Hanslope, in the unitary authority area of the City of Milton Keynes, ceremonial Buckinghamshire, England. It is located on the road that leads from Hanslope to Northampton. The hamlet is named for the road on which the hamlet is located.

References

Hamlets in Buckinghamshire
Areas of Milton Keynes